Gherardi Davis (October 15, 1858 – March 9, 1941) was an American lawyer, book author and politician from New York.

Life
He was born on October 15, 1858 in San Francisco, California, the son of George Henry Davis (1824–1897) and Clara Jane (Gherardi) Davis (1827–1897).

Governor of Massachusetts John Davis was his grandfather; Rear Admiral Bancroft Gherardi was his uncle; and electrical engineer Bancroft Gherardi, Jr. was his first cousin.

In 1868, the family went to Europe, and Gherardi attended school in Germany and college in France.

Career
In 1879, he returned to the United States, and studied law, first in Washington, D.C., and then in New York City. He was admitted to the bar, and practiced law in New York City.

Davis was a member of the New York State Assembly (New York Co., 27th D.) in 1899, 1900, 1901 and 1902; and was Chairman of the Committee on Public Lands and Forestry in 1902.

On March 20, 1903, he was appointed as Third Deputy New York City Police Commissioner.

Sailing
In 1910, he became interested in sailing boats. He competed in regattas with his yacht Alice, and won many prizes.

Personal life
On April 7, 1894, he married Alice King (1860–1920), daughter of State Senator John A. King. Gherardi and Alice Davis published several works on military standards.

He died on March 9, 1941, in the Harkness Pavilion of the Columbia–Presbyterian Medical Center in Manhattan.

Works
 Fahnen und Standarten aus dem Kriege von 1870–71 (New York, 1901)
 Regimental Colors in the War of the Revolution (privately printed at the Gilliss Press; New York; 1907)
 Regimental Colors of the German Armies in the War of 1870–1871 (privately printed at the Gilliss Press, New York, 1911) 
 The Gospels – by a Layman (printed at the Gilliss Press; New York; 1916)

Sources

External links

1858 births
1941 deaths
Writers from Manhattan
Republican Party members of the New York State Assembly
Writers from San Francisco
Deputy New York City Police Commissioners
Gardiner family
American military writers
American male non-fiction writers
20th-century American male writers
20th-century American non-fiction writers